Live from Europe is a live album by the country rock group The Flying Burrito Brothers, released in 1986. It contains songs recorded live for a Dutch radio broadcast and features the same lineup as Cabin Fever. Skip Battin would leave the band mid-1986 and be replaced with David Vaught for some shows.

After the conclusion of touring commitments in 1987, "Sneaky" Pete Kleinow and Gib Guilbeau reunited and recorded some songs for a new Flying Burrito Brothers album with Ray Tabia and Guilbeau's son Ronnie. These recordings remain unreleased. Nothing was heard from the Burritos in 1988, however Kleinow and Guilbeau reunited with John Beland and former colleagues Thad Maxwell and Jim Goodall for a few Burritos shows in Las Vegas and southern California.

Track listing 
 "Streets of Baltimore" (Tompall Glaser, Harlan Howard) – 3:15
 "Cash on the Barrelhead" (Charlie Louvin, Ira Louvin) – 2:25
 "Mystery Train" (Junior Parker, Sam Phillips) – 4:04
 "Christine's Tune (A.K.A. Devil in Disguise)" (Chris Hillman, Gram Parsons) – 3:35
 "Take a City Bride" (Gib Guilbeau) – 3:03
 "Come a Little Closer" – 3:22
 "Blue Eyes" (Gram Parsons) – 2:41
 "Citizen Kane" (Skip Battin, Kim Fowley) – 4:19
 "Don't Go Down the Drain" (Skip Battin) – 3:23
 "Help Is on Its Way" - 2:42

Personnel 
The Flying Burrito Brothers
 "Sneaky" Pete Kleinow - pedal steel guitar
 Skip Battin - vocals, bass
 Greg Harris - vocals, guitar
 Jim Goodall - drums

References 

Live from Europe
Live from Europe